Bridgeport station is a shared Amtrak, Metro-North Railroad, and CTrail train station along the Northeast Corridor serving Bridgeport, Connecticut and nearby towns. On Metro-North, the station is the transfer point between the Waterbury Branch and the main New Haven Line. Amtrak's inter-city Northeast Regional and Vermonter service also stop at the station, as do some CTrail Shore Line East trains. In addition the transfer point for Greater Bridgeport Transit Authority buses, the departure point for the Bridgeport & Port Jefferson Ferry across Long Island Sound to Port Jefferson, New York, and both the Total Mortgage Arena and the Hartford Healthcare Amphitheater are located adjacent to the station.

Opened in 1975, the current station was designed by the local architectural firm of Antinozzi Associates. Unusually, the station spans the six lanes of Water Street, with the passenger waiting room located over the roadway. The simple concrete facades are scored with vertical lines or channels to create a textured surface. Throughout the day, as the sun rakes across the walls, the channels—of varying depth and width—produce a range of ever-changing shadows. Boxy in appearance and punctuated by rectangular windows, the station's angularity is softened by the rounded edges of the access towers.

As of August 2006, average weekday commuter ridership was 3,120 passengers.

Shore Line East service west of New Haven was service suspended indefinitely on March 16, 2020, due to the coronavirus pandemic.

History

The current station was built under ConnDOT and Penn Central in 1975. The relocation was occasioned by the introduction of "Cosmopolitan" M-2 railcars which could only board at high-level platforms, the installation of which was impractical at the old station due to the curvature of the platforms. The 1905 station depot burned down in a fire on March 20, 1979.

A branch line, originally built by New Haven Railroad predecessor Housatonic Railroad to Trumbull, Monroe and Newtown, used to join the main tracks at the old Bridgeport station. All evidence of the junction is now gone, but the related bridges of the line existed near Bridgeport station until the 1990s. Evidence of the line is still visible further north, including a rail bridge crossing the Merritt Parkway near the Route 25 exits, and a rail trail that extends from Trumbull to the Newtown - Monroe town line.

Bridgeport was also close to the scene of three of Connecticut's worst train accidents. The first occurred on July 11, 1911 about a mile west of the station, near where Fairfield Avenue (CT 130) passes underneath and I-95 currently passes overhead. Fourteen people were killed and 40 injured in the disaster; excessive speed through a crossover was the cause. The second occurred on July 14, 1955 due to excessive speed on a sharp curve approaching the station; one person was killed and 58 were injured.  Both accidents involved the same train, the northbound Federal Express overnight train from Washington, D.C. to Boston. The third wreck, involving the derailment and sideswiping collision of two Metro-North trains, occurred on May 17, 2013, close to the same location as the 1911 wreck, injuring 60 passengers on both trains. A track defect was suspected pending completion of an investigation.

Station layout
The station has two high-level side platforms, each eight cars long. The western platform, adjacent to Track 3, is generally used by westbound/southbound Metro-North and Amtrak trains. The eastern platform, adjacent to Track 4, is generally used by eastbound/northbound Metro-North and Amtrak trains. The New Haven Line uses four tracks at this location. The two inner tracks, not adjacent to either platform, are used only by express trains, including the Acela Express.

The station has 1,453 parking spaces, with 950 owned by the state.

Bibliography

References

External links

Bridgeport Amtrak Station (USA Rail Guide -- Train Web)

Metro-North Railroad stations in Connecticut
Amtrak stations in Connecticut
Shore Line East stations
Stations on the Northeast Corridor
Railroad stations in Fairfield County, Connecticut
Buildings and structures in Bridgeport, Connecticut
Transportation in Bridgeport, Connecticut
Stations along New York, New Haven and Hartford Railroad lines
Railway stations in the United States opened in 1975
1975 establishments in Connecticut
Railway stations in the United States opened in 1840
1840 establishments in Connecticut